XEQR-AM (branded as Radio Centro Deportes) is a radio station based in Mexico City. It is owned by Grupo Radio Centro, broadcasting sports programming.

History
XEFO-AM signed on January 1, 1931, as the radio station of the National Revolutionary Party (later the PRI). In 1941, the PRN sold the station to Francisco Aguirre Jiménez. From 1030 AM he would build a broadcasting empire initially known as "Cadena Radio Continental", starting with XERC-AM in 1946 and growing into today's Grupo Radio Centro. That same year, the station took on the name "Radio Centro", branding as "the station of the Mexican family" and positioned itself as a general station similar to XEW-AM; while airing musical programming for most of its existence, in the 1980s, information and entertainment programs were added, and by 1998 non-talk programming had disappeared. Newscasts and sport programs were also present, but were later moved to Radio Red AM and Radio Red FM. Lately, the station aired programs focused on self-help and motivation, hosted by professionals in the topic, and it also aired the live Sunday noon mass from the Mexico City Metropolitan Cathedral (this broadcast was moved to XEN-AM and was also relocated to the Basilica of Our Lady of Guadalupe after the cathedral was damaged by the 2017 Puebla earthquake).

In 2017, citing "changes in AM transmission infrastructure", Grupo Radio Centro reorganized all of its AM radio stations, shutting down several and consolidating their programs. Radio Centro's talk programming, of which only two programs ("Club Nocturno" and "Buenos Días", the former of which has since been cancelled) survived the transition, now shares XEN-AM 690 with El Fonógrafo. XEQR then went silent. Beginning on October 2, 2017, the full slate of talk programming returned as an online and HD Radio-only stream, which only lasted less than two months after a fire affected GRC's headquarters. It wouldn't be until March 2019 when the station's stream returned, although not with all the programming it had prior to 2017. In August, the format absorbed the programming of sister station XERED-AM (which had also become an online-only stream) uniting it under the "Radio Centro 1030" name.

On April 11, 2020 it returned to the air, however, the next day, it switched from the talk format to a simulcast of XERC-FM, and on May 15, concurrent with the announcement that XERC-FM was being sold to MVS Radio, the Internet stream was shut down with all their collaborators dismissed. On May 18, XEQR switched again to a simulcast of XEN-AM. Beginning in July 2020, the station broke away from XEN to air sports programming at certain times and days, but otherwise remained a simulcast.

On June 18, 2022, XEQR rebranded as "Radio Centro Deportes" and stopped simulcasting XEN, now airing sports-related programming.

References

External links

1931 establishments in Mexico
Grupo Radio Centro
Radio stations established in 1931
Radio stations in Mexico City
Sports radio stations in Mexico